Willem van der Ark (born 13 November 1963 in Groningen) is a former Dutch football (soccer) striker, who played for Aberdeen in the late 1980s and early 1990s.

He was one of a series of Dutch players signed for the Scottish side during this time and Van der Ark was bought as a striker and noted for his height (6 foot, 5 inches).

Club career
Van der Ark came through the GVAV Rapiditas youth system and joined Cambuur in 1984. He proved to be an immedatie success alongside fellow striker Bram Rontberg and was sold to Willem II for 250,000 guilders in 1988. He then moved abroad to Scottish side Aberdeen after only half a season in Tilburg.

During his time at Aberdeen he made 77 appearances (38 of them as substitute), scoring 17 goals and securing 2 winners medals – the 1989/90 Skol Cup and 1989/90 Scottish Cup. He played alongside compatriots Theo Snelders, Hans Gillhaus and Peter van de Ven at the club.

He later played for FC Utrecht and FC Den Haag. He left Utrecht to return to Cambuur in summer 1994.

Retirement
Van der Ark now works as a real estate agent in Leeuwarden.

References

External links
 Profile
 Dutch league stats - VI

1963 births
Living people
Footballers from Groningen (city)
Association football forwards
SC Cambuur players
Willem II (football club) players
Aberdeen F.C. players
FC Utrecht players
ADO Den Haag players
Eredivisie players
Eerste Divisie players
Scottish Football League players
Dutch expatriate footballers
Expatriate footballers in Scotland
Dutch expatriate sportspeople in Scotland
Dutch real estate brokers
Dutch footballers